Charles Russell Davis (September 17, 1849 – July 29, 1930) was a member of the United States House of Representatives from Minnesota.

He was born in Pittsfield, Illinois, but moved with his father to Le Sueur County, Minnesota, in 1854, where he attended the public schools and was also instructed by private tutor. He graduated from a business college in St. Paul, Minnesota. Later he studied law and was admitted to the bar on March 6, 1872, and began his law practice in St. Peter, Minnesota. He was elected city attorney and city clerk of St. Peter (1878 – 1898); served as prosecuting attorney of Nicollet County (1879 – 1889 and 1901 – 1903).

He was a captain in the Minnesota National Guard. Elected to the Minnesota House of Representatives in 1889 and 1890; served in the Minnesota Senate from 1891 – 1895. He was elected as a Republican to the 58th, 59th, 60th, 61st, 62nd, 63rd, 64th, 65th, 66th, 67th, and 68th congresses, (March 4, 1903 – March 3, 1925). On April 5, 1917, he was one of 50 representatives who voted against declaring war on Germany. He was chairman of the powerful Committee on Appropriations in the 67th congress, but was an unsuccessful candidate for renomination in 1924.

He resumed his law practice in Washington, D.C., and in St. Peter, Minnesota.

He died in Washington, D.C., at age 80 and was interred in Woodlawn Cemetery, St. Peter.

References
Minnesota Legislators Past and Present

1849 births
1930 deaths
Minnesota lawyers
People from Pittsfield, Illinois
Minnesota National Guard personnel
Lawyers from Washington, D.C.
Republican Party members of the Minnesota House of Representatives
Republican Party Minnesota state senators
Republican Party members of the United States House of Representatives from Minnesota